Euglyphis lascoria is a species of moth of the family Lasiocampidae first described by Herbert Druce in 1890. It is found in Ecuador and Brazil.

References

Moths described in 1890
Lasiocampidae
Moths of South America